Claude Leteurtre (born 30 December 1940 in Donville-les-Bains, Manche) is a member of the National Assembly of France.  He represents the Calvados department,  and is a member of the New Centre.

References

1940 births
Living people
People from Manche
Mayors of places in Normandy
Union for French Democracy politicians
The Centrists politicians
Union of Democrats and Independents politicians
Deputies of the 12th National Assembly of the French Fifth Republic
Deputies of the 13th National Assembly of the French Fifth Republic